The Housing (Financial and Miscellaneous Provisions) Act 1946 was a British Act of Parliament that provided large subsidies for the construction of council housing. This resulted in the completion of over 800,000 local authority houses by 1951.

References

Capitalism and public policy in the UK by Tom Burden and Mike Campbell

See also
 Housing and Local Government (Miscellaneous Provisions) Act (Northern Ireland) 1946, 1946 Chapter 4

United Kingdom Acts of Parliament 1946
Housing legislation in the United Kingdom